Paheli (Hindi: पहेली; translation: riddle) is a 1977 Indian Hindi-language film produced by Tarachand Barjatya for Rajshri Productions. This family drama was directed by Prashant Nanda with Satyajeet and Nameeta Chandra playing the lead characters.

Arun Govil, Nameeta Chandra, Poornima Jayaram, Neena Mahapatra and Anita Singh were debutants to Bollywood screen in this film and Suresh Wadkar as playback singer.

Plot
source:

Brij Mohan (Nitin Sethi) leaves his home in a village to live in Bombay. His mother (Durga Khote) prefers to stay alone in their palatial home. Brij gets married. His wife gives birth and passes away soon after. After few years, Brij is an established businessman and his son Montu (Satyajeet) is studying in his final year in school. He asks Montu to visit his grandmother, which he agrees to reluctantly, provided his friends accompany him. The group face many problems on the way as well as when they reach the village. Hence his friends return to Bombay, leaving Montu with his grandmother. Montu becomes friends with a precocious village girl Gauri (Nameeta Chandra), an orphan living with her cruel aunt, and two equally cruel cousins. Montu and Gauri's friendship blossoms and they meet regularly. He also meets a struggling farmer Balram (Arun Govil), his mother (Leela Mishra), and his fiancée Kanak (Abha Dhulia). Balram would like to go to the city and earn money for his marriage, to which his mother refuses. Against his expectations, Montu finds village life interesting and promises his grandmother to return the next year.

After a year, he finds significant changes in the village. Balram has married and left the village. His ailing mother has died. Gauri refuses to speak with him, while her uncle and aunt are looking for a suitable groom to get her married to. Does Montu understand and appreciate changes in the village against the city life, where he has grown up, and visit his grandmother again?

Cast
Satyajeet - Montu
Nameeta Chandra - Gauri
Nitin Sethi - Brij Mohan
Durga Khote - Brij Mohan's mother
Arun Govil - Balram
Leela Mishra - Balram's mother
A. K. Hangal - Masterji
Dina Pathak - Masterji's wife
Birbal - Birbal, Chauffeur
Abha Dhulia - Kanak
Shivraj - Vaidji, Kanak's father
Poornima Jayaram - Champa
Neena Mahapatra - Roopa
Anita Singh - Rekha
Abka Chuliya

Crew
Director - Prashant Nanda
Producer - Tarachand Barjatya
Production Company - Rajshri Productions
Music Director - Ravindra Jain
Lyricist - Ravindra Jain
Playback Singers - Hemalata, Suresh Wadkar, Chandrani Mukherjee

Songs
source:

"Kanha Ki Zid Par Nachegi Radha, Chaye Aaye Na Aaye Nachna" - Hemlata, Chandrani Mukherjee
"Saheli Ho Paheli Pucchho, O Shari Babu Paheli Bujho" - Suresh Wadkar, Hemlata, Chandrani Mukherjee
"Manmohak Ye Pyara Pyara Gaon" - Suresh Wadkar, Hemlata
"Jaane Kaisi Bahen Ye Hawa, Mujhe Hone Laga Hai Nasha" - Suresh Wadkar
"Tan Bhije Mora Man Bhije Mujh Se Ched Kare Furvai" - Hemlata
"Sonaa Kare Jhil Mil Jhil Mil" - Hemlata, Suresh Wadkar

References

External links

1977 films
Films scored by Ravindra Jain
1970s Hindi-language films
Rajshri Productions films
Films directed by Prashanta Nanda